Raymond Coppinger (died August 14, 2017) was a professor of cognitive science and biology at Hampshire College. He was an expert in dog behavior and the origin of the domestic dog.

Education
He majored in literature and philosophy at Boston University. He received his Ph.D. at the University of Massachusetts in biology. His thesis was on "the effect of experience and novelty on avian feeding behavior."

Career
He was one of the first faculty members at Hampshire College when it was founded in 1969.

He published more than 60 scientific articles, and appeared in many documentaries including for the BBC, the Canadian Broadcasting Company, and PBS.

His wife Lorna Coppinger was a frequent collaborator on research and writing. In their book "What Is a Dog?," they argue that vast majority of street dogs are not strays or lost pets, but rather well-adapted scavengers, similar to the dogs that first emerged thousands of years ago.

Livestock Dog Project
The Coppingers compiled data for ten years from over 1,400 Livestock Guardian Dogs (LGDs) to research their use on American ranches to combat coyotes. Their work is still the single largest, long term study of LGDs.

He and his wife helped develop and popularize the Anatolian Shepherd breed in the United States.

Foxes
His research on foxes has challenged views about domestication syndrome with foxes, suggesting that the traits associated with the syndrome occurred in the fox population prior to their domestication.

Death
Coppinger died at the age of 80, from cancer. He is survived by his wife, Lorna.

Books

References

External links
https://www.imdb.com/name/nm3031823/

Domesticated animal genetics
Domestication of particular species
Hampshire College faculty
Boston University alumni
University of Massachusetts Amherst alumni
2017 deaths